Marjorie Holmes (1910–2002) was an American columnist and best-selling Christian author of 134 books, 32 of which were best sellers.  Holmes is known best for her biblical trilogy which began with the novel Two From Galilee, a love story about Mary and Joseph, published by Fleming H. Revell.

Biography

Born in 1910 in Storm Lake, Iowa, to tractor salesman Sam Holmes and his wife, Marjorie Holmes began writing as a teenager, selling her first story during the Great Depression before graduating from Cornell College in 1931. She met engineering student Lynn Mighell (pronounced mile), a native of Holstein, at a writers' workshop at the University of Iowa.  They married in 1932, living first in McLean then Manassas, Virginia, and had four children, including a daughter named Melanie.  In her spare time, Holmes wrote a twice-weekly syndicated family-life column, "Love and Laughter," for the Washington Evening Star newspaper from 1959 to 1973 and a monthly column, "A Woman's Conversations With God," from 1970 to 1975.  She wrote articles in magazines such as Woman's Day, McCall's, Ladies Home Journal, Reader's Digest, Better Homes & Gardens, Today's Health and Daily Guidepost. She also taught university level writing courses. Her first novel, World By the Tail, was published in 1943. She attracted a loyal audience with her commonsense parables and pick-me-ups published in such volumes as "Hold Me up a Little Longer, Lord" and "Secrets of Health, Energy, and Staying Young," an ode to the miraculous properties of nutritional supplements.

Two From Galilee trilogy
Holmes was inspired to write Two From Galilee after attending a candlelit Christmas Eve church service in 1963, where the nativity scene was reenacted.  Sitting beside her thirteen-year-old daughter, near the hay, Holmes felt transported back to "the fields and barns" of her Iowa childhood.  In the introduction of the book, she wrote, "For the first time in my life, I realised, 'Why, this really happened!' On this night, a long time ago, there actually was a girl having a baby far from home...in a manger, on the hay...and I thought, astonished: 'When Mary bore the Christ child, she couldn't have been much older than my Melanie here beside me!' With this sudden awareness came a thrilling conviction about Joseph: He must have been a young man too.  Old enough to protect and care for Mary and her child, but young enough to be deeply in love with her.  And she with him.  Why not?  They were engaged to be married.  Surely a God, who loved us enough to send his precious son into the world, would want that son to be raised in a home where there was love—genuine human love between his earthly parents."

Holmes spent the next three years researching and writing the story, including traveling to Israel to do research for her novels with the help of Dr. Roy Blizzard, who spoke fluent Hebrew and worked on archaeological excavations throughout Israel. For six years, she took the manuscript from publisher to publisher, only to be told, "You've made the Holy Family as real as the people next door!  You can't do that."  That, however, was precisely what Holmes had intended to do.  Eventually, the book was published in 1972, nine years after that Christmas Eve church service.  The book was published simultaneously in the United States and Canada.  It has never been out of print since Bantam books has published it as well as the sequels Three From Galilee and The Messiah.

Reviews 

The trilogy about the Holy Family did receive some criticism, due in part to things in the novels which contradict things in the New Testament of the Holy Bible.  For example:
 In Two From Galilee, Mary's mother Hannah is described as the stereotypical Jewish mother and Joseph's father Jacob dies from alcoholism.  This is unbiblical and such insinuations could be considered disrespectful.
 In Three From Galilee, 13-year-old John the Baptist urges his 12-year-old cousin, Jesus, to come worship God with wine and song and outeat all the others.  This contradicts the Bible, which states John never drank wine and often fasted.
 Also in Three From Galilee, 29-year-old Jesus falls in love with a 17-year-old Am-ha-aretz girl named Tamara, with whom he becomes enthralled after seeing her bathe in a waterfall. The similarity to the story of King David and Bathsheba is unmistakable. The fictitious Mary Sue character, Tamara, is underage and causes Jesus to neglect his sheep.  This "relationship" would also make him unfaithful to his bride, the church.
 Also in Three From Galilee, both John and Mary have to tell Jesus he is the Messiah and what he must do.  The Bible says Jesus knew at age 12 without being told and told his parents.
 In The Messiah, some of the disciples are described as having blond hair and blue eyes, unlikely for Middle Eastern Jewish men.  See also: race and appearance of Jesus.

Holmes stated in an author's note at the beginning of Three From Galilee, "I do not pretend to claim this is the way things actually happened; only that, given the facts of Jesus' life and times as we know them, this is the way they could have happened."

Musical
Two From Galilee was made into a musical created and written by Robert Sterling and Karla Worley.

Personal life

Holmes' husband Lynn Mighell rose eventually to become a top executive with the Carrier Corporation. He died of cancer in 1979 after years of illness.   During the period of her grieving, Holmes wrote the book To Help You Through the Hurting.  In 1981, when she was 70, Holmes met physician George Schmieler.  Both had lost their mates after nearly 50 years of marriage. Schmieler, grieving the loss of his wife six months earlier, had discovered a book his wife had been reading, I've Got to Talk to Somebody, God  by Marjorie Holmes. Six weeks later he traced Holmes through relatives, called her unlisted phone 
number and announced, "I love you. You saved my life."  She agreed to meet him and, nineteen weeks after they met, Holmes and Schmieler were married. They moved to Pittsburgh, where they lived until his death in 1992.  Holmes dedicated books to him, including Three From Galilee.  She also wrote the book Second Wife, Second Life specifically about him.  Holmes returned to the area of Washington D.C. to live after his death.

Holmes died March 13, 2002, at a nursing home in Manassas after suffering a series of strokes.  She is survived by three children, a sister, six grandchildren and seven great-grandchildren.

References

Christian writers
20th-century American women writers
1910 births
2002 deaths
Cornell College alumni
People from Storm Lake, Iowa